The Goa Business School is a 2019-launched school attached to the Goa University. It was set up following the amalgamation of four earlier-launched departments of the university—Commerce (established in 1988), Computer Science & Technology (1987), Economics (launched in 1968 through the Centre for Post-Graduate Instruction and Research at Goa and affiliated to then University of Bombay) and that of Management Studies (1988).

Purpose
The amalgamation was intended to "allow the faculty and research students to discover new synergies that remained hidden within department silos, re-brand and showcase [Goa University] strengths in research and teaching in these areas together."

Programmes offered
Its academic programmes include: M.SC. Integrated, Integrated MBA (Hospitality, Travel & Tourism), M.A. Economics, M.Com, MCA, MBA, MBA (Executive), MBA (Financial Services), M.Phil (Computer Science), M.Phil (Economics), M.Phil (Management Studies), Ph.D. Commerce, Ph.D. Economics, and Ph.D. Management Studies.

Officiating
As of October 2020, the Dean of the Goa Business School is M.S. Dayanand, Professor of Management Studies; Vice-Dean (Academic) is Subhash K.B., Professor of Commerce; while the Vice-Dean (Research) is Sudarsan P.K.,
Professor of Economics.

IT Summit
In October 2019, the Goa Business School IT Summit (GBSITS) was organised at the Dr Shyama Prasad Mukharjee Indoor Stadium, Taleigao.

Early studies
Some early work which drew media attention included local Goa-related studies looking at palm feni production being affected adversely due to a lack of toddy-tappers, the traditional workers who extracted toddy from coconut trees which abound in the area.

References

External links
Goa Business School
Goa Business School, instagram links

Business schools in Goa
Educational institutions established in 2019
2019 establishments in Goa
Economics schools in India